
Gmina Chełmiec is a rural gmina (administrative district) in Nowy Sącz County, Lesser Poland Voivodeship, in southern Poland.

Villages
Gmina Chełmiec contains the villages and settlements of Biczyce Dolne, Biczyce Górne, Chełmiec, Chomranice, Dąbrowa, Januszowa, Klęczany, Klimkówka, Krasne Potockie, Kunów, Kurów, Librantowa, Marcinkowice, Naściszowa, Niskowa, Paszyn, Piątkowa, Rdziostów, Świniarsko, Trzetrzewina, Ubiad, Wielogłowy, Wielopole, Wola Kurowska and Wola Marcinkowska.

Neighbouring gminas
Gmina Chełmiec is bordered by the gminas of Gródek nad Dunajcem, Grybów, Kamionka Wielka, Korzenna, Limanowa, Łososina Dolna and Podegrodzie.

References
Polish official population figures 2006

Chelmiec
Nowy Sącz County